Elsa Nielsen (born 26 June 1974) is an Icelandic badminton player. She competed in women's singles at the 1992 Summer Olympics in Barcelona, and in women's singles at the 1996 Summer Olympics in Atlanta.

References

External links

1974 births
Living people
Icelandic female badminton players
Olympic badminton players of Iceland
Badminton players at the 1992 Summer Olympics
Badminton players at the 1996 Summer Olympics